The Cudgen Road Tunnel is a twin-tube road tunnel that forms part of the Pacific Motorway (M1) located near Stotts Creek in the Tweed Valley of northern New South Wales, Australia. The twin  tunnels are illuminated inside and accommodate for northbound traffic in one tunnel and southbound traffic in the other tunnel. The tunnels pass under the Cudgen Road and the Condong Range.

Features
Built as part of the Yelgun to Chinderah upgrade of the Pacific Highway to the Pacific Motorway, it opened to traffic on 4 August 2002 and was jointly funded by the New South Wales and Commonwealth governments. It is the first tunnel to be built as part of a rural road project in NSW.

This alignment of the Yelgun to Chinderah motorway was aimed at avoiding the loss of prime cane land, avoiding flood-prone areas and preserving important local animal habitat. The best route was through the Condong Range. A tunnel was chosen instead of a road cutting because it was sympathetic with the surrounding environment by removing the visual impact of a road cutting.

See also

 List of tunnels in Australia

References

Highways in New South Wales
Tunnels in New South Wales
Tunnels completed in 2002
Highway 1 (Australia)
2002 establishments in Australia
Road tunnels in Australia